Elizabeth Wolfgramm (born August 19, 1972) is an American singer and a former member of the family group The Jets, composed of siblings: Eddie, Eugene, Elizabeth, Haini, Kathi, Leroy, Moana, and Rudy Wolfgramm.  Some of her later work has appeared under her married name, Elizabeth Atuaia.

Biography

Early career
Wolfgramm was only 11 years old when her family band, The Jets, was signed to MCA Records. Frequently serving as the lead singer of the group, she is widely considered the face of "The Jets" and quickly became a fan favorite. She recorded their hit song "You Got It All" when she was only 12 years old. The song hit number 1 on the Billboard Adult Contemporary Charts and No. 3 on the Pop Charts.  She remained in the group throughout four albums during the latter half of the 1980s, featuring as the lead vocalist on, in addition to "You Got It All," such major hit songs as "Crush on You," "Cross My Broken Heart," and "Make It Real."

Post-Jets
Wolfgramm left the group in the early 1990s to pursue other projects. In 1990, she recorded the song entitled "Yourself Myself" featured in Tatsuro Song from L.A. (1990), Universal Music. Later, alongside sister Moana, she wrote a few songs for the compilation Return with Honor: 1995 EFY (Especially for Youth) released by Embryo Records. That same year, she teamed up with Marie Osmond's husband, record producer Brian Blosil to record a solo album through Treble V, though the album was never released.  She reunited with Moana in 1997 to record the song "Do" (also featuring younger sister Jennifer) featured in the Be a Builder songbook and companion CD (Vol. 3) Sticks & Stones for the Utah Prevention/Dimension (PK-12) Prevention Program.

In 2002, she recorded the song "Faithful" featured on Love Is a Journey: Reflections on Marriage (2002) released by Shadow Mountain. In 2006, she, along with her sisters Kathi, Moana, Jennifer and Hinalei, released a gospel-themed album entitled My Sisters.

Her rendition of "Never a Better Hero" has also been recorded on CD for distribution.

Personal life
She  married Mark Atuaia - a Hawaii-born, Samoan former BYU Cougars football star and the 2021 running backs coach for the Virginia Cavaliers 2021 - on August 19, 1995. They have seven children: daughters Anessa, Alema, Abi, and Heperi; and sons Tai, Teanekuma and Ropati. She is a member of the Church of Jesus Christ of Latter-day Saints.

Breast cancer survivor
Elizabeth was 19 years old when she was diagnosed with breast cancer. She eventually had her breast removed and has been in remission since. She was told by doctors at the time she would not be able to bear children, yet has now borne seven healthy children.

Notes

External links
 – Updated biography and image
 Interview and image
 IMDB biography

1972 births
Living people
American child singers
American Latter Day Saints
American people of Tongan descent
American people of German descent
Musicians from Salt Lake City
Singers from Utah
20th-century American singers
21st-century American singers
20th-century American women singers
21st-century American women singers